The Yuntan Waterfall is a waterfall in Meishan Township, Chiayi County, Taiwan.

Geology
The waterfall stands at a height of 200 meters divided over three levels.

Transportation
The waterfall is accessible within walking distance east of Jiaoliping Station of Alishan Forest Railway.

See also
 List of waterfalls

References

Waterfalls of Chiayi County